Prize Cases, 67 U.S. (2 Black) 635 (1863), was a case argued before the Supreme Court of the United States in 1862 during the American Civil War.  The Supreme Court's decision declared the blockade of the Southern ports ordered by President Abraham Lincoln constitutional.  The opinion in the case was written by Supreme Court Justice Robert Cooper Grier.

Background
Facing the secession of several states from the Union and the possibility of open hostilities, Abraham Lincoln did not ask Congress to declare war on the Confederate States of America, as he believed that doing so would be tantamount to recognizing the Confederacy as a nation.  Instead, Lincoln instituted a naval blockade, which had important legal ramifications because nations do not blockade their own ports; rather, they close them. By ordering a blockade, Lincoln essentially declared the Confederacy to be belligerents instead of insurrectionists.

The Confederate States were mostly agrarian, and almost all of their machined and manufactured goods were imported. At the beginning of the war there was only one significant steel mill and manufactory in the South, the Tredegar Iron Works in Richmond, Virginia. Moreover, the Southern economy depended on the export of cotton, tobacco, and other crops. The blockade of the South resulted in the capture of dozens of American and foreign ships, both those attempting to run the highly efficient blockade and smuggle goods and munitions to the South as well as those attempting to smuggle exports from the South.

Decision
The question before the court dealt with the seized ships, but it reached widely into the legality of wars against acts of belligerence, whether or not officially declared. It rose through the lower Federal courts through lawsuits by Northern merchants whose ships were seized by U.S. Navy warships enforcing the blockade. In admiralty, a ship captured during war may be kept as a prize. If there is no formal war, capturing ships and impounding them is piracy. Plaintiffs contended that the blockade was not legal because a war had not been declared, thus making it perfectly legal to run the blockade and sell war materiel in the blockaded Southern ports. The government's case was argued by U.S. Attorney Richard Henry Dana Jr., the author of Two Years Before the Mast. On March 10, 1863, the Court ruled that the states of the Southern Confederacy were in insurrection and at war against the United States by acts of belligerency on April 12 and April 17, 1861, to wit: the firing upon Fort Sumter and the Privateering Act proclaimed by Confederate President Jefferson Davis. Lincoln's Proclamation of Blockade was made on April 19, 1861, [Navy Official Records, Series 1, Volume 5, page 620] two days after Davis's call for privateers and it was founded upon acting against privateers, not an open policy of warfare as was later recommended by the ranking General of the Army, Winfield Scott.

In making its decision, the Court looked to recent British interpretations of international law, and concluded that the Southern Confederacy was indeed a belligerent, but a belligerent did not have to be a nation and furthermore that the Civil War was a war, whether declared or not. Justice Robert Grier wrote the 5–4 majority opinion, stating, "[I]t is not necessary to constitute war, that both parties should be acknowledged as independent nations or sovereign States." While the court acknowledged that the United States Congress had, in July 1861, adopted a law ratifying and approving the President's proclamation after the fact, as well as other actions taken since then to prosecute the war, that was not the point. Grier further wrote, "The President was bound to meet it [the war] in the shape it presented itself, without waiting for Congress to baptize it with a name." By this decision, the Supreme Court upheld the President's executive powers to act in accordance with the Presidential oath of office, "to preserve, protect and defend the Constitution of the United States" and to act expediently as the Commander-in-Chief in time of war—a de facto war existing since April 12, 1861.

Dissent by Justice Nelson
The dissenting opinion by the Court noted that the President is not given authority by the Constitution to declare war; the power to declare war lies with Congress. The Civil War did not exist until it was declared so by Congress. Lincoln ordered the blockade before Congress had declared a war. As such, Nelson and the minority believed that the blockade was unconstitutional. They further contend that even had Lincoln been granted the authority for the blockade, he would need to provide the neutral parties with a proper notice of seizure.

See also
 List of United States Supreme Court cases, volume 67

References

External links

United States Supreme Court cases
United States Supreme Court cases of the Taney Court
United States admiralty case law
1862 in United States case law